The 15th Golden Rooster Awards, honoring the best in film, were given on 1995, Beijing.

Winners and nominees

Best Film
The Accused Uncle Shangang/被告山杠爷Police Soul/警魂
吴二哥请神
Narrow Escape/绝境逢生

Best Director Huang Jianxin/Yang Yazhou - Back to Back, Face to Face
Zhou Xiaowen - Ermo

Best Directorial Debut
Fan Yuan - The Accused Uncle Shangang
Ning Haiqiang - Traceless Ballistic Trajectory

Best Writing
Bi Bicheng/Fan Yuan - The Accused Uncle Shangang
Huang Xin/Sun Yian - Back to Back, Face to Face

Best Actor
Li Rentang - The Accused Uncle Shangang
Niu Zhenhua - Back to Back, Face to Face

Best Actress
Ai Liya - Ermo
Xu Fan - Farewell My Love
Pu Chaoying - 女人花

Best Supporting Actor
not awarded this year
Ju Hao - Back to Back, Face to Face

Best Supporting Actress
Ju Xue - Farewell My Love

Best Art Direction
Yang Gang - Conquer
Tan Xiaolin - The Accused Uncle Shangang
Quan Rongzhe - Narrow Escape

Best Cinematography
Bao Xiaoran - South China 1944
Lv Gengxin - Ermo
Zhang Xigui - Girl on the Spot

Best Editing
Sun Huiming - Narrow Escape
Nie Weiguo - 大漠歼匪

Best Music
Chang Yuhong - Conquer
Cheng Dazhao - 广州来的新疆娃

Best Sound Recording
not awarded this year
Yan Jun - Back to Back, Face to Face
Hong Yi - Ermo

Best Animation
White Egg/白色的蛋
黄人黄土
胡僧

Best Documentary
''Old Song of Past Times''/往事歌谣
通一兵－见义勇为的英雄战士徐洪刚

References

External links
历届金鸡奖名单

1995
Golden
Gold